= Caesaromagus =

Caesaromagus may refer to:

- Chelmsford, England, Caesaromagus to the Romans
- Beauvais, France, Caesaromagus to the Romans
